IYM may refer to:

India Yamaha Motor
A number of different Quaker Yearly Meetings:
Indiana Yearly Meeting
Iowa Yearly Meeting
Ireland Yearly Meeting
International Year of Mountains, an international observance